This Can't Be My Life is a 2010 studio album by American singer-songwriter Ruth Gerson.

Reception
In American Songwriter, Mike Berick gave this album three out of five stars, criticizing recurring themes and "the sense of sameness that slips into the listener’s mind during this set of 11 mainly mid-tempo soul-searching tracks", but calling out several tracks as "strong tunes".

Track listing
"Fresh Air" – 4:41
"This Can't Be My Life" – 3:28
"Bulletproof" – 3:47
"Stay with Me" – 4:17
"Someday Soon" – 2:52
"Don't Go (For Em)" – 4:14
"Does Your Heart Weep" – 4:34
"Hazel" – 6:13
"You Lie" – 4:05
"Black Water" – 7:32
"Take It Slow" – 5:26

Personnel
Ruth Gerson – piano, vocals
Additional musicians
David Boyle
Eva Burmeister
Andy Burton
Phill Cimino
Lance Doss
Julia Kent
Byron Isaacs
Libby Johnson
Dan Lubell
Jack Petruzzelli
Marc Shulman
Adam Stern
Daniel Wise
Technical personnel
Rob Goodman – design
Nic Hard – production
Chris Gehringer – mastering
Lisa-Marie Mazzucco – photography
Daniel Wise – recording and mixing

See also
List of 2010 albums

References

External links

2010 albums
Ruth Gerson albums